Cheirolepidoptus is a genus of extinct mite found in Italy. It was classified in 2014. It was found in amber from northern Italy, dating to the Triassic period.

References

Trombidiformes genera
Prehistoric arachnid genera
Triassic arthropods
Triassic animals of Europe
Fossil taxa described in 2014